The Landtag of Schwarzburg-Rudolstadt was the unicameral legislature of the Principality of Schwarzburg-Rudolstadt. It existed from 1821 until 1923, five years after the dissolution of the principality.

History

Article XIII of the 1815 Constitution of the German Confederation compelled member states to adopt constitutions. Friedrich Günther, Prince of Schwarzburg-Rudolstadt led the creation of the principality's constitution and diet in 1816, though the first parliamentary session did not begin until 1821. The initial composition of the parliament consisted of fifteen members representing the manorial lords, city dwellers, and land-owning subjects.

Following the Revolutions of 1848, Schwarzburg-Rudolstadt adopted administrative reforms which effected the diet. The diet was thenceforth composed of nineteen members, elected in equal yet indirect elections. Further administrative reforms took place following the state's entry into the North German Confederation in 1866 and after the dissolution of the Principality and subsequent creation of the short-lived Free State of Schwarzburg-Rudolstadt. The final set of reforms resulted in the reduction of the number of seats in the diet to ten in 1921.

References

Historical legislatures in Germany